The 44th parallel north is a circle of latitude that is 44 degrees north of the Earth's equatorial plane. It crosses Europe, the Mediterranean Sea, Asia, the Pacific Ocean, North America, and the Atlantic Ocean.

At this latitude , astronomically , the dusk is visible circa 15 hours 29 minutes before the dawn during the summer solstice (at the Equator circa 12 hours 7 minutes) and 8 hours, 53 minutes during the winter solstice.

Around the world
Starting at the Prime Meridian and heading eastwards, the parallel 44° north passes through:

{| class="wikitable plainrowheaders"
! scope="col" width="125" | Co-ordinates
! scope="col" | Country, territory or sea
! scope="col" | Notes
|-
| 
! scope="row" | 
| Passing through Montauban
|-
| 
! scope="row" | 
|
|-
| style="background:#b0e0e6;" | 
! scope="row" style="background:#b0e0e6;" | Mediterranean Sea
| style="background:#b0e0e6;" | Gulf of Genoa
|-
| 
! scope="row" | 
| Passing just north of 
|-
| style="background:#b0e0e6;" | 
! scope="row" style="background:#b0e0e6;" | Adriatic Sea
| style="background:#b0e0e6;" |
|-
| 
! scope="row" | 
| Islands of Dugi Otok, Pašman, and the mainland
|-
| 
! scope="row" | 
|
|-
| 
! scope="row" | 
| For about 3 km
|-
| 
! scope="row" | 
|
|-
| 
! scope="row" | 
| Passing through Kragujevac
|-
| 
! scope="row" | 
| Passing through Vidin
|-
| 
! scope="row" | 
| Passing just north of Alexandria
|-
| 
! scope="row" | 
|
|-
| 
! scope="row" | 
| For about 15 km
|-
| 
! scope="row" | 
| For about 4 km
|-
| 
! scope="row" | 
|
|-
| style="background:#b0e0e6;" | 
! scope="row" style="background:#b0e0e6;" | Black Sea
| style="background:#b0e0e6;" |
|-
| 
! scope="row" | 
| Passing just south of Pyatigorsk
|-
| style="background:#b0e0e6;" | 
! scope="row" style="background:#b0e0e6;" | Caspian Sea
| style="background:#b0e0e6;" | Passing just north of Chechen Island, 
|-
| 
! scope="row" | 
|
|-
| 
! scope="row" | 
|
|-
| 
! scope="row" | 
|
|-
| 
! scope="row" | 
| Xinjiang — passing about 22 km north of Ürümqi
|-
| 
! scope="row" | 
|
|-valign="top"
| 
! scope="row" | 
| Inner Mongolia Jilin — passing just north of Changchun Heilongjiang Jilin - for about 2 km Heilongjiang - for <1 km Jilin - for about 10 km Heilongjiang Jilin - for about 5 km Heilongjiang
|-
| 
! scope="row" | 
|
|-
| style="background:#b0e0e6;" | 
! scope="row" style="background:#b0e0e6;" | Sea of Japan
| style="background:#b0e0e6;" |
|-valign="top"
| 
! scope="row" | 
| Island of Hokkaidō:— Hokkaidō Prefecture
|-
| style="background:#b0e0e6;" | 
! scope="row" style="background:#b0e0e6;" | Sea of Okhotsk
| style="background:#b0e0e6;" |
|-valign="top"
| 
! scope="row" | 
| Island of Hokkaidō:— Hokkaidō Prefecture - Shiretoko Peninsula
|-
| style="background:#b0e0e6;" | 
! scope="row" style="background:#b0e0e6;" | Nemuro Strait
| style="background:#b0e0e6;" |
|-
| 
! scope="row" | Kuril Islands
| Kunashir Island, administered by  but claimed by 
|-valign="top"
| style="background:#b0e0e6;" | 
! scope="row" style="background:#b0e0e6;" | Pacific Ocean
|-valign="top"
| 
! scope="row" | 
|  Oregon - passing just south of Eugene and Bend Idaho Wyoming South Dakota - passing just south of Rapid City Minnesota - passing through Rochester Wisconsin - passing through Oshkosh
|-
| style="background:#b0e0e6;" | 
! scope="row" style="background:#b0e0e6;" | Lake Michigan
| style="background:#b0e0e6;" |
|-
| 
! scope="row" | 
| Michigan
|-
| style="background:#b0e0e6;" | 
! scope="row" style="background:#b0e0e6;" | Lake Huron
| style="background:#b0e0e6;" |
|-
| 
! scope="row" | 
| Ontario
|-
| style="background:#b0e0e6;" | 
! scope="row" style="background:#b0e0e6;" | Lake Ontario
| style="background:#b0e0e6;" |
|-valign="top"
| 
! scope="row" | 
| New York - passing just north of Watertown Vermont - passing through Middlebury New Hampshire Maine
|-valign="top"
| style="background:#b0e0e6;" | 
! scope="row" style="background:#b0e0e6;" | Atlantic Ocean
| style="background:#b0e0e6;" | Gulf of Maine - passing just south of Vinalhaven Island and Isle au Haut, Maine,  
|-
| 
! scope="row" | 
| Nova Scotia
|-
| style="background:#b0e0e6;" | 
! scope="row" style="background:#b0e0e6;" | Atlantic Ocean
| style="background:#b0e0e6;" |
|-
| 
! scope="row" | 
| Nova Scotia - Sable Island
|-
| style="background:#b0e0e6;" | 
! scope="row" style="background:#b0e0e6;" | Atlantic Ocean
| style="background:#b0e0e6;" |
|-
| 
! scope="row" | 
| 
|-
|}

See also
43rd parallel north
45th parallel north

References

n44